Anthony Michel Taugourdeau (born 3 June 1989) is a French professional footballer who plays a defensive midfielder for Italian  club Turris.

Career

Pisa
Born in Marseille, France, Taugourdeau started his professional career in Italy, for Pisa Calcio. He made his Serie B debut on 1 November 2008, against Bari (later the 2009 champion). He replaced Alessandro Birindelli in the 85th minute, with the team losing 0–1 and ended with the same score.

Carpi
After the team went bankrupt, he moved to Serie D side Carpi and scored 9 goals in the league and 1 in promotion playoffs, as regular season team second goalscorer behind Stefano Menchini (12 goals) and overall the 4th team highest goalscorer of the season behind Menchini (12+0 goals), Andrea Ferretti (6+5 goals. who only played half season) and Enrico Gherardi (7+4 goals). Carpi also entered the promotion playoffs and after 6 matches, Carpi finished as losing semi-finalists but were promoted due to numbers of team expelled from professional league due to financial difficulties.

AlbinoLeffe
Taugourdeau did not remain with the team, instead he was offered a contract from Serie B club AlbinoLeffe.

He was signed by A.C. Prato in a temporary deal in January 2011.

On 1 January 2015 Taugourdeau left AlbinoLeffe again for Santarcangelo Calcio.

Piacenza
On 3 August 2015 Taugourdeau was signed for Piacenza.

Trapani
In July 2017 he was signed by Trapani.

Piacenza again
In January 2018 he moved back to Piacenza on loan.

Trapani again
In July 2018 he moved back to Trapani from loan, and won the Serie C.

Venezia
On 27 August 2020 he signed a 3-year contract with Venezia.

Vicenza
On 31 August 2021 he moved to Vicenza on a two-year deal.

Turris
On 26 August 2022, Taugourdeau joined Serie C club Turris on a two-year contract.

References

External links
 Football.it Profile 

French footballers
French expatriate footballers
Serie B players
Serie C players
Pisa S.C. players
U.C. AlbinoLeffe players
A.C. Prato players
Piacenza Calcio 1919 players
Trapani Calcio players
Venezia F.C. players
L.R. Vicenza players
S.S. Turris Calcio players
Association football midfielders
Expatriate footballers in Italy
French expatriate sportspeople in Italy
1989 births
Living people